Yaminan-e Olya (also Romanized as Yamīnān-e ‘Olya; also known as Yamīnān-e Bālā, Yamnān-e Bālā, and Yamnān-e ‘Olyā) is a village in Avalan Rural District, Muchesh District, Kamyaran County, Kurdistan Province, Iran. At the 2006 census, its population was 112, in 28 families. The village is populated by Kurds.

References 

Towns and villages in Kamyaran County
Kurdish settlements in Kurdistan Province